The 53rd parallel south is a circle of latitude that is 53 degrees south of the Earth's equatorial plane. It crosses the Atlantic Ocean, the Indian Ocean, the Pacific Ocean and South America.

At this latitude the sun is visible for 16 hours, 56 minutes during the December solstice and 7 hours, 34 minutes during the June solstice. If the latitude in the southern hemisphere is 53º45′ or smaller, everyday of the month of February can view both astronomical dawn and astronomical dusk.

Around the world
Starting at the Prime Meridian and heading eastwards, the parallel 53° south passes through:

{| class="wikitable plainrowheaders"
! scope="col" width="125" | Co-ordinates
! scope="col" | Country, territory or ocean
! scope="col" | Notes
|-
| style="background:#b0e0e6;" | 
! scope="row" style="background:#b0e0e6;" | Atlantic Ocean
| style="background:#b0e0e6;" |
|-
| style="background:#b0e0e6;" | 
! scope="row" style="background:#b0e0e6;" | Indian Ocean
| style="background:#b0e0e6;" | Passing just north of the McDonald Islands, 
|-
| 
! scope="row" | 
| Heard Island
|-
| style="background:#b0e0e6;" | 
! scope="row" style="background:#b0e0e6;" | Indian Ocean
| style="background:#b0e0e6;" |
|-
| style="background:#b0e0e6;" | 
! scope="row" style="background:#b0e0e6;" | Pacific Ocean
| style="background:#b0e0e6;" |Passing just south of Campbell Island, New Zealand
|-
| 
! scope="row" | 
| Desolación Island, Magallanes Region
|-
| style="background:#b0e0e6;" | 
! scope="row" style="background:#b0e0e6;" | Pacific Ocean
| style="background:#b0e0e6;" | Strait of Magellan
|-
| 
! scope="row" | 
| Muñoz Gamero Peninsula and Riesco Island, Magallanes Region
|-
| style="background:#b0e0e6;" | 
! scope="row" style="background:#b0e0e6;" | Pacific Ocean
| style="background:#b0e0e6;" | Seno Otway
|-
| 
! scope="row" | 
| Brunswick Peninsula, Magallanes Region
|-
| style="background:#b0e0e6;" | 
! scope="row" style="background:#b0e0e6;" | Pacific Ocean
| style="background:#b0e0e6;" | Strait of Magellan
|-
| 
! scope="row" | 
| Isla Grande de Tierra del Fuego, Magallanes Region
|-
| 
! scope="row" | 
| Isla Grande de Tierra del Fuego, Tierra del Fuego Province
|-valign="top"
| style="background:#b0e0e6;" | 
! scope="row" style="background:#b0e0e6;" | Atlantic Ocean
| style="background:#b0e0e6;" | Passing just south of Beauchene Island,  (claimed by )
|}

See also
52nd parallel south
54th parallel south

References

s53